Clifton Allen Groce (born July 30, 1972) is a former professional American football running back in the National Football League. He played five seasons for the Indianapolis Colts and the Cincinnati Bengals.

1972 births
Living people
People from College Station, Texas
Players of American football from Texas
American football running backs
Texas A&M Aggies football players
Indianapolis Colts players
Cincinnati Bengals players
New England Patriots players